Howser Spire, or Howser Spire Massif, is a group of three distinct granite peaks, and the highest mountain of the Canadian Bugaboo Spires. The mountain is located at the southwest corner of the Vowell Glacier, within the Bugaboo mountain range in the Purcell Mountains, a subrange of British Columbia's Columbia Mountains, 

Howser Spire is named after the town of Howser on Duncan Lake and Howser Creek.

The first ascent of the North Tower was made in August 1916 by Conrad Kain, Albert MacCarthy, E. MacCarthy, J. Vincent and Henry .

The Beckey-Chouinard/West Buttress route is recognized in the historic climbing text Fifty Classic Climbs of North America and considered a classic around the world.

Climate
Based on the Köppen climate classification, Howser Spire is located in a subarctic climate zone with cold, snowy winters, and mild summers. Winter temperatures can drop below −20 °C with wind chill factors below −30 °C. This climate supports the Vowell Glacier on the peak's north slope.

Nearby
 Brenta Spire
 Bugaboo Spire (3,204 m)
 Conrad Kain hut
 Crescent Towers
 Hound's Tooth
 Marmolata Spire
 Pigeon Spire (3,156 m)
 Snowpatch Spire (3,084 m)

Gallery

References

 Canadian Alpine Journal vol VIII, 1917, p. 17, and in CAJ 1938, pp 17 & 22.
 J.M. Thorington's "Guide to the Interior Ranges of British Columbia", 1947, p. 97.

External links
 

Columbia Valley
Three-thousanders of British Columbia
Purcell Mountains
Kootenay Land District